John Arthur Kennedy (February 17, 1914January 5, 1990) was an American stage and film actor known for his versatility in supporting film roles and his ability to create "an exceptional honesty and naturalness on stage", especially in the original casts of Arthur Miller plays on Broadway. He won the 1949 Tony Award for Best Featured Actor in a Play for Miller's Death of a Salesman. He also won the Golden Globe for Best Supporting Actor for the 1955 film Trial, and was a five-time Academy Award nominee.

Early life and education 
Kennedy was born on February 17, 1914, in Worcester, Massachusetts, the son of Helen (née Thompson) and John Timothy "J.T." Kennedy, a dentist. He attended South High School, Worcester, and graduated from Worcester Academy. He studied drama at the Carnegie Institute of Technology in Pittsburgh, Pennsylvania, graduating with a B.A. in 1934.

Career
Kennedy moved to New York City and, billed as John Kennedy, joined the Group Theatre. He then toured with a classical repertory company. In September 1937, he made his Broadway debut as Bushy in Maurice Evans' Richard II at the St. James Theatre. In 1939 he played Sir Richard Vernon in Evans' Henry IV, Part 1.

Kennedy made his entry into films when he was discovered by James Cagney. His first film role was of Cagney's younger brother in City for Conquest in 1940. He appeared in many Western films and police dramas.

During World War II, Kennedy served from 1943 to 1945 in the United States Army Air Forces (USAAF) making aviation training films, both as a narrator and an actor. Many of those films serve as historical records of how aviators were trained and flight equipment was operated.

Kennedy appeared in many notable films from the early 1940s through mid-1960s, including High Sierra, Champion, They Died with Their Boots On, The Glass Menagerie, The Desperate Hours, Trial, Peyton Place, Some Came Running, A Summer Place, Elmer Gantry, The Man from Laramie, Barabbas, Lawrence of Arabia, Nevada Smith and Fantastic Voyage.

Of Kennedy's film work, he is perhaps best-remembered for his collaborations with director Anthony Mann and co-star James Stewart on Bend of the River (1952) and The Man from Laramie (1955), in both of which he played sympathetic villains. Kennedy also enjoyed film success in England during the 1950s, usually playing the lead role in b-movies whenever an American character was needed. He played mostly laid-back ladies' men, avuncular husband types or down-on-their—luck con men chancing it in the UK.

He also enjoyed a distinguished stage career over the same period, receiving a Tony Award for his role of Biff Loman in Arthur Miller's Death of a Salesman (1949). He inaugurated three other major characters in Miller plays: Chris Keller in All My Sons (1947), John Proctor in The Crucible (1953) and Walter Franz in The Price (1968). In 1961 he played the title role in Becket, opposite Laurence Olivier as Henry II.

On February 5, 1959, Kennedy appeared on the episode "Make It Look Good" of CBS's Dick Powell's Zane Grey Theatre.

In 1974, Kennedy was a regular on the short-lived ABC police drama Nakia, as Sheriff Sam Jericho.

Waning interest, ill-health, then comeback 

With the death of his wife in 1975, failing eyesight, alcoholism, and thyroid cancer, Kennedy was reported as having lost interest in filmmaking. After Covert Action (1978), his next films were The Humanoid (1979) and Signs of Life (1989).

Awards and honors 

In 1949, Kennedy won a Tony Award for best supporting actor as Biff in Arthur Miller's Death of a Salesman at the Morosco Theatre.

The New York Film Critics named him Best Actor for Bright Victory (1951).

His performance in Trial won him a Golden Globe Award for Best Supporting Actor.

His portrayal of the newspaper reporter in Elmer Gantry (1960) gained him a Film Daily Award and a Limelight Award.

Oscar nominations 
Kennedy received a nomination for Best Actor for his performance in Bright Victory (1951).

Personal life
Kennedy married Mary Cheffey in March 1938. They had two children: actress Laurie Kennedy and Terence.

Death

During the last years of his life, Kennedy had thyroid cancer and eye disease. He spent much of his later life in Savannah, Georgia, out of the public eye.

Filmography

City for Conquest (1940) as Eddie Kenny
High Sierra (1941) as 'Red'
Knockout (1941) as Johnny Rocket
Strange Alibi (1941) as Joe Geary
Bad Men of Missouri (1941) as Jim Younger
Highway West (1941) as George Foster
They Died with Their Boots On (1941) as Ned Sharp
Desperate Journey (1942) as Flying Officer Jed Forrest
Air Force (1943) as Bombardier
Reconnaissance Pilot (1943, documentary short) as Decoration Announcer (voice, uncredited)
Resisting Enemy Interrogation (1944) as Sgt. Alfred Mason (uncredited)
Ditch and Live (1944, Short) as Captain Scott H. Reynolds (uncredited)
Time to Kill (1945, Short) as Narrator (uncredited)
Target - Invisible (1945, documentary short) as Narrator (uncredited)
Devotion (1946) as Branwell Brontë
It's Your America (1946, Short) as Soldier (uncredited)
Boomerang (1947) as John Waldron
Cheyenne (1947) as Chalk
The Walking Hills (1949) as Chalk
Champion (1949) as Connie
The Window (1949) as Ed Woodry
Too Late for Tears (1949) as Alan Palmer
Chicago Deadline (1949) as Tommy Ditman
The Glass Menagerie (1950) as Tom Wingfield
Bright Victory (1951) as Larry Nevins
Red Mountain (1951) as Lane Waldron
Bend of the River (1952) as Emerson Cole
Rancho Notorious (1952) as Vern Haskell
The Girl in White (1952) as Dr. Ben Barringer
The Lusty Men (1952) as Wes Merritt
Impulse (1954) as Alan Curtis
Crashout (1955) as Joe Quinn
The Man From Laramie (1955) as Vic Hansbro
The Desperate Hours (1955) as Deputy Sheriff Jesse Bard
Trial (1955) as Barney
The Naked Dawn (1955) as Santiago
The Rawhide Years (1956) as Rick Harper
Peyton Place (1957) as Lucas Cross
Twilight for the Gods (1958) as First Mate Ramsay
Some Came Running (1958) as Frank Hirsh
The Ten Commandments (1959, TV Movie) 
Home Is the Hero (1959) as Willie O'Reilly
A Summer Place (1959) as Bart Hunter
Elmer Gantry (1960) as Jim Lefferts
Claudelle Inglish (1961) as Clyde Inglish
Murder, She Said (1961) as Dr. Quimper
Barabbas (1961) as Pontius Pilate
Hemingway's Adventures of a Young Man (1962) as Dr. Adams
Lawrence of Arabia (1962) as Jackson Bentley
Attack and Retreat (1964) as Ferro Maria Ferri
Cheyenne Autumn (1964) as Doc Holliday
Murieta (1965) as Capt. Love
Joy in the Morning (1965) as Patrick Brown
Nevada Smith (1966) as Bill Bowdre
Fantastic Voyage (1966) as Dr. Duval
Monday's Child (1967) as Peter Richardson
Day of the Evil Gun (1968) as Owen Forbes
A Minute to Pray, a Second to Die (1968) as Tuscosa Marshal Roy W. Colby
Anzio (1968) as Maj. Gen. Jack Lesley
Hail, Hero! (1969) as Albert Dixon
Shark! (1969) as Doc
The Movie Murderer (1970, TV Movie) as Angus MacGregor
My Old Man's Place (1971) as Walter Pell
A Death of Innocence (1971, TV Movie) as Mark Hirsch
Crawlspace (1972, TV Movie) as Albert Graves
I Kiss the Hand (1973) as Don Angelino Ferrante
Ricco the Mean Machine (1973) as Don Vito
The President's Plane Is Missing (1973, TV Movie) as Gunther Damon
The Man from Independence (1974) as Tom Pendergast
Let Sleeping Corpses Lie (1974) as The Inspector
The Antichrist (1974) as Bishop Ascanio Oderisi
Killer Cop (1975) as Armando Di Federico
The Tough Ones (1976) as Ruini
 (1976) as Mike Jannacone
La spiaggia del desiderio (1976) as Antonio
The Sentinel (1977) as Monsignor Franchino
Nine Guests for a Crime (1977) as Uberto
Gli ultimi angeli (1978) as Il nonno
Bermuda: Cave of the Sharks (1978) as Mr. Jackson
Cyclone (1978) as The Priest
Porco mondo (1978) as Senator Merelli
Covert Action (1978) as CIA Chief of Station, Athens
The Humanoid (1979) as Dr. Kraspin
Signs of Life (1989) as Owen Coughlin
I figli del vento (1989, TV Movie)
Grandpa (1990) (final film role)

References

External links

 
 
 Arthur Kennedy at Turner Classic Movies
 
 Photographs of Arthur Kennedy tombstone, Nova Scotia.
 Literature on Arthur Kennedy

1914 births
1990 deaths
American male film actors
American male stage actors
Best Supporting Actor Golden Globe (film) winners
Deaths from cancer in Connecticut
Deaths from brain cancer in the United States
Donaldson Award winners
Male actors from Worcester, Massachusetts
Worcester Academy alumni
Tony Award winners
Male Western (genre) film actors
United States Army Air Forces soldiers
First Motion Picture Unit personnel
20th-century American male actors
Carnegie Mellon University College of Fine Arts alumni